Korilophyton is a genus of branching Cambrian acritarchs of presumed algal affinity.

References

Cambrian life
Acritarch genera